Pulot Tartal, pulut tai tai or pulut tekan is a Nyonya glutinous rice dessert. Originating from Melaka, Malaysia, it is also commonly served in other states in the country as well.

Preparation
Glutinous rice (pulut) is steamed in coconut milk. The rice is then dyed blue with bunga telang (Clitoria ternatea). It is usually served with kaya as a dipping.

Similar dishes
It is different from, and often confused with nasi kerabu, which originated from Kelantan. Both pulut tekan and nasi kerabu are dyed blue with the same bunga telang flower.

References

External links 
 

Malaysian cuisine
Rice dishes